The Arabian cat snake (Telescopus dhara) is a species of snake of the family Colubridae.

Geographic range

This snake is found in Africa and the Middle East.

References 

Telescopus
Reptiles described in 1775
Snakes of Africa
Snakes of Asia